(born July 7, 1953) is a Japanese singer and actress. She is well known for her comedy roles featuring idiosyncratic looks, and a string of successful torch songs that gained popularity in the late 1970s and early 1980s.

Biography 
In 1971, Ken debuted as an enka-oriented singer with a single "Daitokai no Yasagure On'na". In 1975, after the release of several charted singles, she gained the first outstanding commercial success with a song "Guzu", which was written by Ryudo Uzaki and his wife Yoko Aki. "Abayo", a song written by Miyuki Nakajima became the most successful single for Ken, selling more than 600,000 copies. In 1976, the prize-winning song reached number-one spot on the Oricon, Japan's most eminent chart.  In addition to the success as a musician, she also obtained popularity as a tarento in the mid 1970s, through her comical acts on multiple TV shows including Kakkurakin Daihousou!!.

After a temporary hiatus in 1977 owing to her arrest on suspicion of possession of marijuana, she returned to the Japanese entertainment industry with the hit tune "Kamome wa Kamome". The melancholic ballad written by Nakajima became known as one of her signature songs, finally sold in excess of 300,000 units.  In 1982, she gained huge commercial success as a singer again with a cover version of the Southern All Stars' song "Natsu wo Akiramete", winning several Japanese music prizes. The song is her last top-ten hit solo single so far.

Due to her songs’ popularity, Ken was selected for the annual Red and White Song festival every year from 1976 to 1986 except 1977, the year that she went hiatus due to her drug case, and made another return to the prestigious programme on 1993 for her 11th and last appearance so far. 

Through her long-term career as a comedic TV personality, she has released several novelty singles with other performers such as Ken Shimura. The song "Natsuzakari Ho no Ji Gumi" recorded with an idol singer Toshihiko Tahara in 1985 is the last top-40 hit single for Ken on the Japanese record charts. To date, her last single was released in 1985.

Discography

Solo singles

Other singles

Studio albums 
  (1973)
  (1974)
  (1975)
  (1976)
 　(1977)
 Naoko VS Miyuki (a.k.a. ) (1978)
 Naoko VS Aku Yu (1979)
  (1980)
  (1981)
 Naoko Mistone (1983)
  (1983)
 Again (1984)
 
 Deep (1985)
 Bitter (1989)
 Re-Naoko  (1992)
 Ago  (1993)
 Love Life Live  (2008)

Compilations

Filmography

Kōhaku Uta Gassen Appearances

References

External links 
 Official site (Japanese)
 
 JMDb Profile (in Japanese)

1953 births
Living people
Japanese women singers
Japanese actresses
Musicians from Shizuoka Prefecture